More Dollars for the MacGregors (Italian:Ancora dollari per i MacGregor, Spanish:La muerte busca un hombre) is a 1970 Spaghetti Western film directed by José Luis Merino and starring Peter Lee Lawrence, Carlos Quiney and Malisa Longo.

Cast
 Peter Lee Lawrence as Robert McGregor / Blondie  
 Carlos Quiney as George Forsyte
 Malisa Longo as Yuma  
 Stelvio Rosi as Ross Steward  
 Mariano Vidal Molina as Joe Saxon  
 María Salerno as Maticha  
 María Mahor as Gladys McGregor  
 Luis Marín as Pancho 
 Antonio Mayans as Young Man after Saxon  
 Dan van Husen as Frank Landon  
 Antonio Jiménez Escribano as Old Tradesman 
 José Jaspe as Sheriff of Jonesville  
 José Marco as Debuty sheriff  
 Stefano Caprioti
 Enrique Ávila 
 Giancarlo Fantini
 Enzo Fisichella 
 Renato Paracchi 
 Santiago Rivero 
 Claudio Trionfi

References

Bibliography 
 Thomas Weisser. Spaghetti Westerns--the Good, the Bad and the Violent: A Comprehensive, Illustrated Filmography of 558 Eurowesterns and Their Personnel, 1961-1977. McFarland, 2005.

External links 
 
 More Dollars for the MacGregors at Variety Distribution

1970 films
1970 Western (genre) films
Spaghetti Western films
Spanish Western (genre) films
1970s Italian-language films
1970s Spanish-language films
Films shot in Almería
1970 multilingual films
Spanish multilingual films
1970s Italian films